Stacey Emma Lynch BSc (Hons), Ph.D. (born 9 June 1980) is an Australian virologist and researcher at the Victorian Department of Environment and Primary Industries, AgriBio.

Early life and education
Lynch was born in Brisbane, Queensland, Australia and spent her early years on the family farm on the Sunshine Coast. Her family moved to Darwin, Northern Territory where she completed her primary education. The family relocated to Melbourne, Victoria where she completed her high school education at Highvale School in the South Eastern suburb of Glen Waverley.

Lynch was awarded a Bachelor of Science from Monash University Clayton with majors in Microbiology and Biochemistry in 2000. She completed her Bachelor of Science (Honours) in 2001 in the Monash University Department of Microbiology, where she conducted research into the gene regulation of one of the bacterial pathogens responsible for meningitis in humans, Neisseria meningitidis.

Lynch was awarded an Australian Postdoctoral Award Industry scholarship through an ARC linkage grant with Pfizer Animal Health to investigate the molecular pathogenesis of equine rhinitis A virus. She was awarded her Ph.D. from The University of Melbourne, Veterinary Science in 2010.

Career

Lynch received post-doctoral training through a joint appointment with the University of Liverpool, UK and the International Livestock Research Institute (ILRI)., based in Addis Ababa, Ethiopia. In this role, Lynch established a diagnostic laboratory for poultry microbial diseases at the Ethiopian Institute for Agricultural Research and supported the activities of local and UK based PhD and MSc students in fields such as virology, parasitology, population genetics and socioeconomics.

Lynch currently coordinates the entomology, virology and veterinary surveillance activities for the Victorian Arbovirus Disease Control program. This project aims to reduce the incidence of human infection through surveillance, virus detection, education and control.

Lynch's team is responsible for the veterinary diagnostic serology testing of zoonotic arboviruses in Victoria. As part of an integrated surveillance program, Lynch and her team at the Department of Environment and Primary Industries (DEPI) monitor mosquito vector species and arbovirus carriage at ten Victorian local government areas annually between November and April.

Lynch is the Executive Officer for the Victorian Arbovirus Taskforce, a subject matter expert panel who examine the risk of arbovirus outbreaks in Victoria, and is on the advisory committee to the Victorian Department of Health.

Lynch and her team at DEPI also respond to exotic mosquitoes incursions in Victoria such as the detection of Aedes albopictus at a quarantine centre in the outskirts of Melbourne in December 2012.

In April 2014, Lynch was a keynote speaker at the 8th AMREP World Health Day Forum which had the theme ‘Deadly Bite: The Global Threat of Vector-borne Diseases’. Lynch's talk was entitled "Mosquito Surveillance and Control in Victoria'.

Lynch has developed an early warning system to identify mosquito-borne viral diseases, based on gene-sequencing technology.

References

External links
Burnet Institute World health Day Forum
Collaborative Victorian Arbovirus Surveillance Data Analysis

Australian women scientists
1980 births
Living people
Women virologists
Australian virologists
People from Brisbane
Monash University alumni
University of Melbourne alumni
Scientists from Queensland